Dzintra Blūma (born 26 January 1958, in Riga) is a Latvian slalom canoer who competed in the early to mid-1990s. Competing in two Summer Olympics, she earned her best finish of 24th in the K-1 event in Barcelona in 1992.

References

External links
 
 

1958 births
Living people
Latvian female canoeists
Olympic canoeists of Latvia
Canoeists at the 1992 Summer Olympics
Canoeists at the 1996 Summer Olympics